Cesar Chavez/67th Street is a light rail station in Houston, Texas on the METRORail system. It is served by the Green Line and is located on Harrisburg Boulevard at South Cesar Chavez Boulevard (formerly 67th Street) in the East End.

Cesar Chavez/67th Street station opened on January 11, 2017 as part of the Green Line's second phase, extending it from Altic/Howard Hughes station to Magnolia Park Transit Center.

References

METRORail stations
Railway stations in the United States opened in 2017
2017 establishments in Texas
Railway stations in Harris County, Texas